Rod Morris is an Australian former professional rugby league footballer who played in the 1970s and 1980s. An Australian international and Queensland State of Origin representative front row forward, he played club football in the New South Wales Rugby Football League for Balmain, and in the Brisbane Rugby League for Eastern Suburbs (with whom he won the 1977 and 1978 Grand Finals) and Wynnum-Manly (with whom he won the 1982 Grand Final).

Playing career

Morris was a Brisbane Easts player who first represented for Queensland in 1976 and then Australia in 1977. He signed with the Balmain Tigers in 1979 and was brought to Sydney, thus becoming eligible to play for New South Wales under the selection criterion of the time. In the 1979 interstate series he played against his Queensland resident brother Des Morris. He then played for Queensland in 1980 in the first ever Rugby League State of Origin  under the new origin selection criterion.

He was a 1978 Kangaroo tourist playing in two Tests and ten minor tour matches. He played in all three Tests of the 1979 domestic Ashes series which Australia won 3-0.

Morris made a return to  Brisbane club football in 1982 and captained Wynnum-Manly at the age of 32 to a Brisbane Rugby League premiership title which was Wynnum-Manly's first ever. He put in a man-of-the-match performance in the 2nd game of the 1982 State of Origin series before making his last representative appearances in that year's Kangaroo Tour, playing in four tour matches and contributing to the Invincibles' unbeaten tour record, being the only player in the team, however, to not score a try on the tour.

Morris is also remembered for his short-lived "Deer in the headlights" style when making his Channel Nine debut as a commentator for the 1989 State Of Origin series.

He is one of a number of players to have represented both Queensland and New South Wales and one of those rare foundation Origin representatives whose NSW appearances were bookended by selections for Queensland.

Now Rod Morris is owner and operator of McDonald's restaurants in the South-Eastern suburbs of Brisbane. The store's that he owns include; Victoria Point, Capalaba, Capalaba Park and Cannon Hill. He previously owned Cleveland, Albion and Wynnum West stores until he sold them to both to his sons-in-law.

Sources
 Andrews, Malcolm (2006) The ABC of Rugby League Austn Broadcasting Corpn, Sydney

1950 births
Living people
Wynnum Manly Seagulls players
Queensland Rugby League State of Origin players
New South Wales rugby league team players
Rugby league players from Ipswich, Queensland
Balmain Tigers players
Eastern Suburbs Tigers players
Australia national rugby league team players
Rugby league props